The 1951–52 Oberliga  was the seventh season of the Oberliga, the first tier of the football league system in West Germany and the Saar Protectorate. The league operated in five regional divisions, Berlin, North, South, Southwest and West. The five league champions and the runners-up from the south, north and west then entered the 1952 German football championship which was won by VfB Stuttgart. It was VfB Stuttgart's second national championship, having previously won it in 1950.

The 1951–52 season saw the return of the clubs from the Saar Protectorate to the West German league system which had left in 1948, 1. FC Saarbrücken and Borussia Neunkirchen rejoining the Oberliga Südwest. Eventually, on 1 January 1957, the Saar Protectorate would officially join West Germany, ending the post-Second World War political separation of the territory from the other parts of Germany.

A similar-named league, the DDR-Oberliga, existed in East Germany, set at the first tier of the East German football league system. The 1951–52 DDR-Oberliga was won by Turbine Halle.

Oberliga Nord
The 1951–52 season saw two new clubs in the league, Victoria Hamburg and Lüneburger SK, both promoted from the Amateurliga. The league's top scorer was Ernst-Otto Meyer of VfL Osnabrück with 29 goals, the highest total for the five Oberligas in 1951–52.

Oberliga Berlin
The 1951–52 season saw two new clubs in the league, BFC Nordstern and VfL Nord Berlin, both promoted from the Amateurliga Berlin. The league's top scorer was Horst Schmutzler of Tennis Borussia Berlin with 25 goals.

Oberliga West
The 1951–52 season saw three new clubs in the league, Meidericher SV, Bayer Leverkusen and Schwarz-Weiß Essen, all promoted from the 2. Oberliga West.	The league's top scorer was Karl Hetzel of Meidericher SV with 25 goals.

Oberliga Südwest
The 1951–52 season saw four new clubs in the league, VfR Frankenthal and SpVgg Weisenau promoted from the Amateurliga, while 1. FC Saarbrücken and Borussia Neunkirchen joined from the Ehrenliga Saarland. The league's top scorer was Gerhard Siedl of Borussia Neunkirchen with 27 goals.

Oberliga Süd
The 1951–52 season saw two new clubs in the league, Viktoria Aschaffenburg and Stuttgarter Kickers, both promoted from the 2. Oberliga Süd. The league's top scorers were Max Morlock (1. FC Nürnberg) and Helmut Preisendörfer (Kickers Offenbach) with 26 goals each.

German championship

The 1952 German football championship was contested by the eight qualified Oberliga teams and won by VfB Stuttgart, defeating 1. FC Saarbrücken in the final. The eight clubs played a home-and-away round of matches in two groups of four. The two group winners then advanced to the final.

Group 1

Group 2

Final

|}

References

Sources
 30 Jahre Bundesliga  30th anniversary special, publisher: kicker Sportmagazin, published: 1993
 kicker-Almanach 1990  Yearbook of German football, publisher: kicker Sportmagazin, published: 1989, 
 DSFS Liga-Chronik seit 1945  publisher: DSFS, published: 2005
 100 Jahre Süddeutscher Fußball-Verband  100 Years of the Southern German Football Federation, publisher: SFV, published: 1997

External links
 The Oberligas on Fussballdaten.de 

1951-52
1
Ger